WJSH (104.7 FM) is a classic country-formatted radio station licensed to Folsom, Louisiana. The format is known as "The Highway 104.7".

Previous callsigns were WSJH and WSJZ.

On October 25, 2019, this signal was transferred to North Shore Broadcasting.

References

External links
 North Shore Media Radio Stations
 

Radio stations in Louisiana
Radio stations established in 1996
1996 establishments in Louisiana
Classic country radio stations in the United States
St. Tammany Parish, Louisiana